Chris A. Butler (August 14, 1952 – April 30, 1994) was an American set decorator. He was nominated for an Academy Award in the category Best Art Direction for the film Chaplin. He died at his home in Los Angeles, from complications of AIDS.

Selected filmography
 Chaplin (1992)

References

External links

1952 births
1994 deaths
American set decorators
AIDS-related deaths in California